The Cape York frog or peninsula frog (Cophixalus peninsularis) is a species of frog in the family Microhylidae.
It is endemic to Australia.
Its natural habitat is subtropical or tropical moist lowland forests.

References

Sources

Cophixalus
Amphibians of Queensland
Taxonomy articles created by Polbot
Amphibians described in 1985
Frogs of Australia